Ralph D. Malone (born January 12, 1964 in Huntsville, Alabama) was a National Football League player for the Cleveland Browns from 1986–1987, and was on the practice roster for the Los Angeles Raiders and the Miami Dolphins from 1986 to 1989. He played collegiately for the Georgia Tech football team.

Malone is the President and CEO of Triana Industries, a manufacturer of wire harnesses and cable assemblies.

References

1964 births
Living people
Sportspeople from Huntsville, Alabama
American football defensive ends
Georgia Tech Yellow Jackets football players
Cleveland Browns players